Bras d'Or Lake (Mi'kmawi'simk: Pitupaq) is an irregular estuary in the centre of Cape Breton Island in Nova Scotia, Canada. It has a connection to the open sea, and is tidal. It also has inflows of fresh water from rivers, making the brackish water a very productive natural habitat. It was designated the Bras d'Or Lake Biosphere Reserve by UNESCO in 2011.

Toponym 
Pronounced (  or  ), maps before 1872 name it Le Lac de Labrador (or more simply Labrador). Labrador was the name given by the Portuguese to much of eastern Canada. It meant farmer, and is cognate with laborer. An error of folk etymology, the name is spelt to resemble the French language Arm of Gold, a homonym. It is also called locally The Bras d'Or Lakes.

In Mi'kmawi'simk, the lake's name, Pitupaq, refers to the brackish waters, meaning "the long salt water."

Geography 

The lake has a surface area of 1099 square kilometers. Three arms stretch out to the north east. At the top, the Great Bras d'Or Channel connects to the ocean via a navigable channel. It sits in 3,500 square kilometer drainage basin.

The western side is generally shallow, and is part of an extensive drumlin field. Steep hills rise abruptly on the northwestern side, to the Cape Breton Highlands.

The Denys, Middle, Baddeck, and Georges Rivers all empty into the lake. The lake water has lower salinity than the surrounding ocean, and varies from about 20 parts per thousand near river mouths to 29 parts per thousand in deeper areas.

Ice cover has been declining in recent years.

The lake is connected to the North Atlantic by two natural channels; the Great and Little Bras d'Or Channels which pass on either side of Boularderie Island. The southern tip of the lake is connected to the Atlantic Ocean via the St. Peters Canal, built for shipping traffic in the 1860s.

The restricted channels to the ocean cause a reduction in tidal range.

Seaweed populations resemble those found in the Gulf of St. Lawrence. The warm waters are suitable for eastern oyster. Fish species include the blackspotted stickleback, white hake, blueback herring, Greenland cod, and introduced  rainbow trout. These feed double-crested cormorants, bald eagles, and great blue herons.

Human history 

Mi'kmaq peoples have lived in the area for the last 4,000 years. Named Unama'ki in their language, it is the fire (or capital district) of their country, Mi'kma'ki, part of the greater Wabanaki Confederacy of the Dawnland region. The Mi'kmaq call the lake Pitupaq, meaning long salt water. A French trading post was built in 1650. Alexander Graham Bell built an estate Beinn Bhreagh where he established a research laboratory, and used the lake to test man-carrying kites, airplanes and hydrofoil boats.

Most of the shore is undeveloped, but settlements include Baddeck, Eskasoni, Little Bras d'Or, St. Peter's, and Whycocomagh. Shoreline is under the jurisdiction of the Cape Breton Regional Municipality and the county municipalities of Inverness, Victoria, and Richmond.

Sailboat racing is a long tradition in the Bras d'Or, with events hosted by the Bras d'Or Yacht Club 

Today most economic activity around the lake is related to the services in the tertiary sector of the economy.

See also 

 Bras d'Or Lake Scenic Drive
 Chapel Island First Nation
 Barra Strait: a narrows in the middle of the lake, transversed by the Barra Strait Bridge and the Grand Narrows Bridge.
 St. Patricks Channel: an arm of the lake

Gallery

References

External links 
"Cruisers' guide to the Brad d'Or Lakes and Coastal Harbours"

Estuaries of Canada
Lakes of Nova Scotia
Saline lakes of Canada
Landforms of Inverness County, Nova Scotia
Landforms of Richmond County, Nova Scotia
Landforms of Victoria County, Nova Scotia
Landforms of the Cape Breton Regional Municipality
Alexander Graham Bell